Sydowia is a genus of fungi in the family Dothioraceae described by Giacomo Bresadola in 1895. The name honours German mycologist, Paul Sydow.

Species 
As accepted by Species Fungorum;
 Sydowia agharkarii 
 Sydowia ceanothi 
 Sydowia gregaria 
 Sydowia japonica 
 Sydowia polyspora 
 Sydowia prosopidis 
 Sydowia randiae 
 Sydowia semenospora 
 Sydowia slippii 
 Sydowia solitaria 
 Sydowia wolfii  

Former species;
 Sydowia dothideoides   = Dothiora dothideoides, Botryosphaeriaceae
 Sydowia eucalypti   = Pseudosydowia eucalypti, Saccotheciaceae]]
 Sydowia lepargyrea   = Dothiora lepargyrea, Botryosphaeriaceae
 Sydowia pruni   = Dothiora pruni, Botryosphaeriaceae
 Sydowia taxicola   = Dothiora taxicola, Botryosphaeriaceae
 Sydowia versiformis  = Dothiora versiformis, Botryosphaeriaceae

References 

Dothideales
Dothideomycetes genera
Taxa named by Giacomo Bresadola
Taxa described in 1895